Ilya Olegovich Romanko   (born 10 October 1981 in Stavropol) is a creative producer of Comedy Club TV show on TNT channel (since 2018), a former member and author of the “United Pyatigorsk” KVN team, one of the authors of the sketch comedy show "Nasha Russia".

Biography 

A member and author at “United Pyatigorsk” KVN team, which won the KVN Top League in 2004.
From 2007 to 2011, he was one of the authors of the iconic sketch comedy show "Nasha Russia".
In 2009, he worked as an author on the installation of the Russian famous TV series "Univer". In the same year he became the author and editor of the Comedy Club. Since 2018, he has held the position of creative producer of the project.

In 2014, 2016, 2018 and 2021 he was one of the authors of Pavel Volya's solo concerts.

Awards

For the Comedy Club project 
 TEFI Award in the category "Humorous program" (2017).

Personal life 
Married. Has a son.

References 

Living people
Russian television personalities
KVN
1981 births